The Kahar is community found in north east India and  Bangladesh. They are a community of palanquin bearers and agriculturists, from the Hindu Kahar caste. The Kahar are also known as Sardars, especially in Murshidabad District.

Origin

The Muslim Kahar claim to be descended from Pashtun settlers, who came to Bengal in the early middle ages. They were traditionally a community of palanquin bearers, an occupation no longer practiced by the community. The word Kahar is said to be derived from the Sanskrit word shandha kara, meaning those who carry things on their shoulders. They are fairly widely distributed in West Bengal and Bangladesh, in particular in the districts of Murshidabad, 24 Parganas and Nadia. The community speak Bengali and are Sunni Muslims.

Present circumstances

The Kahar have now abandoned their traditional occupation of palanquin bearing, and are now mainly a community of agriculturists. They now cultivate paddy, wheat, jute and vegetables. 

A significant numbers are also employed as daily wage labourers.

The Kahar live in multi-caste villages, occupying their own quarters, known as sardar paras. They are strictly endogamous, and marry within the community. Each Kahar settlement has an informal caste council, known as a panchayat, which acts as an instrument.

References

Social groups of West Bengal
Muslim communities of India
Social groups of Bangladesh